Geraldton railway station was located on the Kwinana-Geraldton and Northampton lines in Western Australia. It served the city of Geraldton.

History
On 26 July 1879, the original Geraldton station opened as part of the Northampton line. It was the first government railway station in Western Australia. With the discovery of gold in the Murchison River, a new station was built off Durlacher Street. On 8 August 1900, it became the Geraldton Mechanic's Institute Library, with a second storey added in 1908. In 1975, the library was shifted to a new location and in 1979 the building was handed over to the WA Museum. When the WA Museum relocated to its new premises in 2000, the old station building lay vacant until restored in 2014 as the City of Greater Geraldton Visitor Centre.

In 1911, a third station opened, with the second relocated to become the District Engineers Office.

The station is today utilised by Transwa road coach services to Perth.

References

External links

Disused railway stations in Western Australia
Geraldton
Railway stations in Australia opened in 1879
Railway stations in Australia opened in 1911
Listed railway stations in Australia
State Register of Heritage Places in the City of Greater Geraldton